James John Hart (November 27, 1875 –  August 31, 1926) was a Major League Baseball first baseman. In 58 career games, he had 64 hits in 206 at-bats, with 23 RBIs. He batted right and left-handed.

On August 5, 1901 Hart punched umpire John Haskell after being called out at third base. American League president Ban Johnson suspended Hart as result of the incident:
"This is the first time a player in the American League has struck an umpire‚ and it is an offense that cannot be overlooked."

References

External links

1875 births
1926 deaths
Baltimore Orioles (1901–02) players
Major League Baseball first basemen
Baseball players from Minnesota
St. Paul Apostles players
St. Paul Saints (Western League) players
Buffalo Bisons (minor league) players
Wheeling Stogies players
Seattle Siwashes players